Dominik Eberle (born July 4, 1996) is an American football placekicker for the Seattle Sea Dragons of the XFL. He played college football for the Utah State Aggies. He made his NFL debut in Week 16 of the 2021 NFL season.

Early life
Eberle was born in Nuremberg, Germany in 1996 to Güenther Eberle and Carmen Romero-Eberle. He has one sibling. Eberle eventually moved to California and attended Redondo Union High School where he played football and soccer.

College career
Eberle enrolled to play football at Utah State University in 2015 and redshirted his first year. After appearing in 4 games in his redshirt first year, Eberle earned starting kicking duties in 2017 as a redshirt sophomore. Eberle performed well appearing in all 13 games, hitting all 47 extra point attempts, and hitting 18 of 24 field goal attempts. Eberle was named a finalist for the Lou Groza Award. Eberle would go on to start his junior and senior seasons. Eberle finished his career at Utah State hitting 64 field goals and 167 extra points, setting the program record for field goals made.

Professional career

Las Vegas Raiders
After going undrafted in the 2020 NFL Draft, Eberle was signed to the practice squad for the Las Vegas Raiders.

Carolina Panthers
In 2021, Eberle would join the Carolina Panthers practice squad. After being cut and resigned again, Eberle was ultimately cut again from the Panthers.

Houston Texans
Ahead of week 16, Houston Texans kicker Kaʻimi Fairbairn was placed on the COVID-19 restricted list, and in anticipation, the Texans signed Eberle to their practice squad. On December 26, 2021, Fairbairn was unable to return to the team and Eberle was promoted to debut in his first NFL game against the Los Angeles Chargers. He was released on January 5, 2022.

Carolina Panthers (second stint)
On January 8, 2022, Eberle was signed to the Carolina Panthers practice squad.

Green Bay Packers
On February 22, 2022, Eberle signed with the Green Bay Packers. On June 14, he was released.

Detroit Lions
On September 9, 2022, Eberle was signed to the Detroit Lions practice squad. He was promoted to the active roster on October 1. He was released on October 4, after missing two extra points in Week 4.

NFL career statistics

References

External links
Utah State Aggies bio

1996 births
Living people
American football placekickers
Carolina Panthers players
Detroit Lions players
German players of American football
Green Bay Packers players
Houston Texans players
Las Vegas Raiders players
Sportspeople from Nuremberg
Utah State Aggies football players